Wounded Bird Records is an American compact disc only re-issue record label that was founded in 1998 in Guilderland, New York.

They re-release lesser known albums from popular and lesser known artists, including Paul Butterfield, Cactus, Herbie Mann, Brownsville Station, Stalk-Forrest Group, Faster Pussycat, Debbie Harry, Steve Smith, Foghat, Steve Khan, Tom Rush, Labelle, Jean-Luc Ponty, Cher, Bread, Billy Cobham, Debbie Gibson, Chic, Don Ellis, David Blue, Gordon Haskell, Blood, Sweat & Tears, and Sparks. Most of the Wounded Bird catalogue is licensed from Warner Music Group (including Atlantic Records) and Sony Music Entertainment.

Notable artists released

 Ace Spectrum
 A Foot in Coldwater
 Agent Orange
 Toshiko Akiyoshi
 Jan Akkerman
 Joe Albany
 Alessi Brothers
 Steve Allen
 Harold Alexander
 Phil Alvin
 Amazing Rhythm Aces
 Ambrosia
 David Amram
 Jon Anderson
 Apollonia
 April Wine
 Argent
 Horacee Arnold
 Ashford & Simpson
 Tony Ashton and Jon Lord
 The Assembled Multitude
 Brian Auger
 Patti Austin
 Axe
 Aztec Camera
 Randy Bachman
 Back Street Crawler
 Bad Company
 Badfinger
 Badger
 Ginger Baker
 John Baldry
 The Bangles
 Barnaby Bye
 Barrabás
 Bobby Barth
 Count Basie
 Baton Rouge
 Bay City Rollers
 Beggars & Thieves
 Harry Belafonte
 Adrian Belew
 Delia Bell
 Belle Epoque
 George Benson
 Jan Berry
 Stephen Bishop
 Blackfoot
 Black Heat
 Black Oak Arkansas
 Black Pearl
 Ruben Blades
 The Blasters
 Blood, Sweat & Tears
 David Blue
 The Blues Brothers
 B-Movie
 Bo Grumpus
 Bob & Ray
 Bonaroo (band)
 Booker T. & The MG's
 Boulder
 Terence Boylan
 Ruby Braff
 Laura Branigan
 Brave Belt
 Bread
 Lenny Breau
 Brick
 The Brides of Funkenstein
 Brilliant
 Britny Fox
 David Bromberg
 Albert Brooks
 Mel Brooks
 Danny Joe Brown
 Jocelyn Brown
 Brownsville Station
 Dave Brubeck
 Peabo Bryson
 Roy Buchanan
 Roger Daltrey
 BulletBoys
 Hiram Bullock
 Kenny Burrell
 Gary Burton
 Jenny Burton
 The Bus Boys
 Paul Butterfield
 Butterfield Blues Band
 Charlie Byrd
 Donald Byrd
 The Byrds
 Cactus
 Jonathan Cain
 John Cale
 The Call
 Cab Calloway
 Jim Capaldi
 Irene Cara
 Carillo
 Larry Carlton
 Pete Carr
 Carlene Carter
 Lynda Carter
 Ron Carter
 Cate Brothers
 Phillip Catherine
 Felix Cavaliere
 Peter Cetera
 Change
 Harry Chapin
 Blondie Chaplin
 Chase
 Boozoo Chavis
 Cheap Trick
 Cher
 Don Cherry
 Chic
 Eric Clapton
 Petula Clark
 Allan Clarke
 Stanley Clarke
 Clefs of Lavender Hill
 Jimmy Cliff
 Rosemary Clooney
 Billy Cobham
 Joe Cocker
 Jude Cole
 Paul Collins' Beat
 Alice Coltrane
 Commander Cody and His Lost Planet Airmen
 Compost
 Don Cooper
 Chick Corea
 Larry Coryell
 Bill Cosby
 Couchois
 Country Joe & The Fish
 Randy Crawford
 Crawler
 Crazy Horse
 Marshall Crenshaw
 Cross Country
 D.A.D.
 Dada
 Roger Daltrey
 Charlie Daniels
 Dave Davies
 Jesse Ed Davis
 Paul Davis
 Deodato
 The Del Fuegos
 Delaney & Bonnie
 John Denver
 Rick Derringer
 Jackie DeShannon
Detective
 Buck Dharma
 The Dickies
 The Dictators
 Al Di Meola
 Dino, Desi & Billy
 Dr. John
 Thomas Dolby
 Klaus Doldinger
 Danny Douma
 The Dregs
 The Dream Academy
 Les Dudek
 George Duke
 The Dukes
 Cornell Dupree
 Robbie Dupree
 Earth Opera
 Elliot Easton
 Ebn Ozn
 Eddie & the Tide
 Dave Edmunds
 Bernard Edwards
 Jonathan Edwards
 Electric Angels
 Electric Flag
 Duke Ellington
 Don Ellis
 Herb Ellis & Charlie Byrd
 England Dan & John Ford Coley
 Enuff Z'Nuff
 Envy
 Juan Garcia Esquivel
 David Essex
 Kevin Eubanks
 Europe
 Eugenius
 Phil Everly
 Eye to Eye
 Face to Face
 Fandango
 Mark Farner
 Farquahr
 Joe Farrell
 Farrenheit
 Faster Pussycat
 Fatback
 Don Felder
 José Feliciano
 Michael Fennelly
 Maynard Ferguson
 54-40
 Figures on a Beach
 Mike Finnigan
 Fiona
 Firefall
 Fire Town
 Michele Fischietti
 Flatt & Scruggs
 Mick Fleetwood
 Flint
Fludd
Foghat
Ellen Foley
Robben Ford
Sonny Fortune
Fotomaker
Samantha Fox
Aretha Franklin
Chico Freeman
Ace Frehley
Frehley's Comet
The Frost
The Fugs
Richie Furay
Eric Gale
Gamma
Gang of Four
David Gates
Danny Gatton
Bob Geldof
Debbie Gibson
Louise Goffin
Jerry Goodman
GoodThunder
Dexter Gordon
Larry Graham
Lou Gramm
Grand Funk Railroad
Stephane Grappelli
Great Buildings
Green on Red
Greenslade
Grinderswitch
David Grisman
Steve Grossman
Guadalcanal Diary
Vince Guaraldi
Gunhill Road
John Hall
Tom T. Hall
Hall & Oates
Jan Hammer
Peter Hammill
Roland Hanna
Herbie Hancock
The Happenings
Harem Scarem
Rufus Harley
Don Harrison Band
Noel Harrison
Deborah Harry
Lisa Hartman
Gordon Haskell
Richie Havens
Ronnie Hawkins
Bonnie Hayes (& The Wild Combo)
Lee Hazlewood
Heads Hands & Feet
Headpins
Hellion
Joe Henderson
Scott Henderson
Woody Herman
Dan Hicks
Highway Chile
Chris Hillman
Robyn Hitchcock
The Hollies
Holly and the Italians
Holy Modal Rounders
Honeymoon Suite
Paul Horn
Horslips
Hot Tuna
Steve Howe
Freddie Hubbard
Ray Wylie Hubbard (and The Cowboy Twinkies)
Alberta Hunter
Steve Hunter
Icon
Ides Of March
Idle Eyes
Incredible String Band
James Ingram
Iron Butterfly
Peter Ivers
Debora Iyall
Chris Jagger
James Gang
Keith Jarrett
The J. Geils Band
Jo Jo Gunne
Eric Johnson
Alphonso Johnson
Michael Johnson
Tom Johnston
Elvin Jones
Howard Jones
Clifford Jordan
The Judybats
Jules and the Polar Bears
Michael Kamen
Peter Kaukonen
Keep It Dark
Kensington Market
Robin Kenyatta
Doug Kershaw
Bobby Keys
Steve Khan
Kick Axe
Kid Creole and the Coconuts
Carole King
Jonathan King
King Curtis
King's X
Kissing the Pink
Kix
John Klemmer
Earl Klugh
John Koerner
Alexis Korner
Danny Kortchmar
Kris Kristofferson
Kris Kristofferson and Willie Nelson
Joachim Kühn
Labelle
The Ladder
L.A. Express
Lamb
Nicolette Larson
Yusef Lateef
Stacy Lattisaw
Hubert Laws
Lazarus
Leader of the Pack
Bernie Leadon
Geddy Lee
Peggy Lee
Jerry Lee Lewis
Mingo Lewis
Ramsey Lewis
Gordon Lightfoot
Lighthouse
David Lindley
Little Feat
Lobo
Dave Loggins
Loggins and Messina
Kenny Loggins
Looking Glass
Trini Lopez
Jeff Lorber
Lord Sutch
Loudness
Louisiana Red
Love (band)
Lovecraft
Lulu
George Lynch
Phil Lynott
Jack Mack and the Heart Attack
Lonnie Mack
Jakob Magnusson
Taj Mahal
Mahavishnu Orchestra
Malice
Mama's Pride
Melissa Manchester
Henry Mancini
Mandala
Howie Mandel
Manhattan Transfer
Herbie Mann
Arif Mardin
Charlie Mariano
Wynton Marsalis
Eric Martin Band
Marilyn Martin
Steve Martin
The Masked Marauders
Mason Proffit
Johnny Mathis
Matrix
Paul McCandless
Les McCann
Jay McShann
John McEuen
John McLaughlin
Meat Loaf
Randy Meisner
Melanie Safka
Memphis Slim
Jim Messina
The Mighty Lemon Drops
Mighty Sparrow
Barry Miles
Buddy Miles
Glenn Miller
Ministry
Mink DeVille
Mr. Big
Kim Mitchell
Modern English
Modern Jazz Quartet
Modern Romance
Molly Hatchet
Modern English
Mondo Rock
Montrose
Ronnie Montrose
Glen Moore
Gayle Moran
More
Airto Moreira
The Steve Morse Band
Bob Mosley
Mother Earth
Mother's Finest
Mott the Hoople
Rob Mounsey
Mountain
Alphonse Mouzon
Idris Muhammad
Geoff Muldaur
Maria Muldaur
Michael Martin Murphey
Jim Nabors
Nantucket
Fred Neil
Tracy Nelson
Neon Philharmonic
Nervous Eaters
The New Cactus Band
New England
New Riders of the Purple Sage
The New Seekers
David "Fathead" Newman
Newport Jazz Festival All Stars
Juice Newton
Nitty Gritty Dirt Band
Jack Nitzsche
Tom Northcott
Aldo Nova
NRBQ
Mark O'Connor
Ohio Express
Danny O'Keefe
One to One
Oregon
Benjamin Orr
Johnny Otis
Outlaws
Overkill
Buck Owens
Pacific Gas & Electric
David Pack
Painter
Pandoras
Mica Paris
Graham Parker
Passport
Jaco Pastorius
Robbie Patton
Henry Paul Band
Peaches and Herb
Pearls Before Swine
Jim Pepper
Petra
Shawn Phillips
Pieces of a Dream
Dave Pike
Mary Kay Place
Plasticland
Poco
Point Blank
The Pointer Sisters
Polyrock
Jean-Luc Ponty
Bud Powell
Roger Powell
Prophet
Pure Prairie League
Flora Purim
Quill
Quiver
Eddie Rabbitt
Ramatam
Boots Randolph
Rank and File
Kenny Rankin
Tom Rapp
Raven
Dave Ray
Pat Rebillot
Redbone
Red Rockers
Renaissance
Buddy Rich
Riggs
Terry Riley
Lee Ritenour
Rocket 88
The Rockets
Jimmie Rodgers
Nile Rodgers
Red Rodney with Ira Sullivan
Gregg Rolie
Romeo Void
Root Boy Slim
Rose Royce
Rough Cutt
Rubber (A.K.A. Harem Scarem)
The Rubinoos
Tom Rush
Patrice Rushen
Leon Russell
Sabicas
Doug Sahm
Saigon Kick
David Sanborn
David Sancious
Peter Schilling
Timothy B. Schmit
Neal Schon & Jan Hammer
Marilyn Scott
Tom Scott
The Screaming Blue Messiahs
Earl Scruggs
Dan Seals
Seals and Crofts
The Searchers
Seatrain
The Section
Neil Sedaka
Pete Seeger
Michael Sembello
Doc Severinsen (with Henry Mancini)
Sha Na Na
Shadow King
Woody Shaw
Shaw Blades
Show of Hands
Janis Siegel
Siegel–Schwall Band
Patrick Simmons
Sinceros
Sister Sledge
Sixwire
Sleeze Beez
Sly & The Family Stone
Small Faces
Smashed Gladys
Jimmy Smith
Rex Smith
Steve Smith
Phoebe Snow
Sons of Angels
The Soup Dragons
J. D. Souther
Souther, Hillman, Furay Band
Southern Pacific
Sparks
Jeremy Spencer
SPK
Rick Springfield
Squeeze
Chris Squire
Stalk-Forrest Group
Starpoint
The Statler Brothers
Candi Staton
Steps Ahead
Mike Stern
Gary Stewart
Sandy Stewart
The Stooges
Streets
Stuff
Sugarfoot
Ira Sullivan
Sylvain Sylvain
The System
Tangerine Dream
Tangier
Marc Tanner Band
Kate Taylor
Teegarden & Van Winkle
Sonny Terry & Brownie McGhee
Thin Lizzy
Mickey Thomas
Linda Thompson
Billy Thorpe
Three Man Army
Throwing Muses
Thunder
Pam Tillis
Julie Tippetts
George Tipton
TNT
Tomita
Translator
Trapeze
Trash
Treasure
Tribal Tech
Roger Troutman
Robin Trower
Tuff Darts
Joe Lynn Turner
Stanley Turrentine
24-7 Spyz
McCoy Tyner
Twennynine with Lenny White
James Blood Ulmer
Undisputed Truth
Until December
Urban Verbs
Michael Urbaniak
Ritchie Valens
Vandenberg
Vanilla Fudge
Johnny Van Zant
Edgar Varese
Alan Vega
Martha Veléz
Tom Verlaine
Vicious Rumors
Vinegar Joe
Virginia Wolf
Vital Information
Joe Vitale
Miroslav Vitous
V.S.O.P.
Narada Michael Walden
Jerry Jeff Walker
Junior Walker
T-Bone Walker
George Wallington
Wally
Joe Walsh
Steve Walsh
Bill Watrous
Ernie Watts
Weather Report
Art Webb
Eric Weissberg & Deliverance
Bob Welch
Wendy & Lisa
Clarence Wheeler
Wet Willie
Alan White
Josh White
Lenny White
Michael White
Wild Horses
Wildlife
The Wild Swans
Lenny Williams
Flip Wilson
Nancy Wilson
Jesse Winchester
Winger
Edgar Winter
Johnny Winter
Wipers
Wishbone Ash
Peter Wolf
Ronnie Wood
Roy Wood
Stevie Woods
The World
World's Greatest Jazz Band
Wrath
Wrathchild America
Gary Wright
Tammy Wynette
Xciter
Jesse Colin Young
The Youngbloods
Zager and Evans
Joe Zawinul

See also
List of record labels

References

External links

American record labels
Jazz record labels
Rock record labels
Record labels established in 1998
Reissue record labels
Companies based in Albany County, New York
1998 establishments in New York (state)